Hamar-Daban (from  - "nut", and , "pass" or "ridge"), is a mountain range in Southern Siberia, Russia.

Geography
The range is located in Buryatia, with a small section in Irkutsk Oblast. It rises near the Baikal Mountains not far from Lake Baikal. It forms a geographic prolongation of the Sayan Mountains. The southern end of the range is part of the Selenga Highlands.

Climate

In popular culture
The song of the same name by Yuri Vizbor, written in 1962, is dedicated to the range.

1993 incident
Six members of a seven-person hiking group led by Lyudmila Korovina died in mysterious circumstances in 1993. Valentina Utochenko was the only survivor. While it was reported that all the victims showed the symptoms of bleeding through their eyes and ears and frothing at the mouth, later autopsy examinations ignored these symptoms and claimed signs of hypothermia and protein deficiency in the deceased members of the hiking group as the cause of death.

See also
Baikal Nature Reserve
South Siberian Mountains

References

External links

Mountain ranges of Russia
Landforms of Siberia
Landforms of Buryatia
Landforms of Irkutsk Oblast
South Siberian Mountains